Steine is a fishing village in the municipality of Vestvågøy in Nordland county, Norway.

References

Vestvågøy
Villages in Nordland
Populated places of Arctic Norway